Juruti is a municipality in western Pará state, Brazil, on the Amazon River. This is the site of a new giant Alcoa bauxite mine that has changed the face of this previously neglected area.

The city is served by Juruti Airport.

References

External links
 Official homepage of Juruti
  Alcoa Website about the Juruti Bauxite Mine

Populated places on the Amazon
Municipalities in Pará